Into the Storm or Churchill at War (alt. title) is a 2009 biographical film about Winston Churchill and his days in office during the Second World War. The movie is directed by Thaddeus O'Sullivan and stars Brendan Gleeson as the British Prime Minister. Into the Storm is a sequel to the 2002 television film The Gathering Storm, which details the life of Churchill in the years just prior the war. Into the Storm had its first public premiere on HBO and HBO Canada on 31 May 2009.

Into the Storm was nominated for 14 Primetime Emmy Awards. Brendan Gleeson won the Primetime Emmy Award for Outstanding Lead Actor in a Miniseries or a Movie.

Synopsis
The Second World War has recently ended in Europe, and the people of the United Kingdom are awaiting the results of the 1945 general election. During this time, Winston Churchill goes to France for a holiday with his wife Clemmie. Through a series of flashbacks, Churchill recalls some of his most glorious moments during the war, and the effect it had on their marriage.

Into the Storm continues on from The Gathering Storm.  It is set against the backdrop of World War II, and looks at how Churchill's success as a great wartime leader ultimately undermined his political career and threatened his marriage to "Clemmie" - Clementine Hozier.

The film proper begins shortly after the Second World War commences in September 1939, as Prime Minister Neville Chamberlain calls Churchill and Edward Wood, 1st Earl of Halifax, to a private meeting. Chamberlain informs Halifax and Churchill that he knows he will be condemned by the British public for failing to recognize Hitler as a threat in time, and therefore intends to resign from office. Asked if he would be willing to hold the office of Minister for War under Lord Halifax as the new Prime Minister, Churchill remains silent until Halifax reluctantly speaks up, indicating Churchill would be the better choice as Prime Minister. Churchill then intones, "Yes. I think so, too."

Churchill immediately moves to take charge of a confused, overworked government and lead the British people into a second world war. He argues bitterly with some members of his cabinet, including Lord Halifax, as the situation in Continental Europe rapidly deteriorates. As country after country falls to the German invaders, Churchill adamantly maintains that no deal with Hitler will ever be considered, let alone accepted. Though much-criticized for it at the time within his government, Churchill's decision hardens British resolve: with any idea of parley with the Nazis out of the question, the only route forward is to fight on until the end. Churchill gathers influential members of the leftist Labour Party and convinces them to forge a coalition government, arguing that political and personal differences must be set aside to win the war. He meets then-unknown Major General Bernard Montgomery at a static gun emplacement on the British coastline, and approves the stern-faced Montgomery's demand that his division be provided with buses in order to rapidly move to wherever German forces might land.

Because night bombing on continental Europe with restricted and specific targets has been ineffective, Marshal Arthur Harris urges Churchill to commence bombing German factories. Clement Attlee argues against this due to the inevitable heavy collateral damage that this would cause, but is overruled by Churchill, who tells Harris to "Let them have it." Churchill soon after visits a Royal Air Force fighter squadron in the midst of the Battle of Britain, where he is well received by the young pilots until they are interrupted by a scramble call. As the pilots sprint to their fighters and take off, Churchill solemnly removes his cap in salute. As he returns to his car, he tells an aide, "They're so young. There's so few of them. Never in the field of human conflict have so many owed so much to so few." Churchill is fascinated by the impossible odds facing Britain in the battle and the war overall; they drive him to be utterly indomitable in the face of the Nazi threat, seeming to Churchill as the fulfillment of a personal wish to protect the British Empire in its greatest hour of need.

The film periodically shows Churchill's counterpart in the United States, President Franklin Delano Roosevelt, with whom he steadily establishes a strong friendship despite Roosevelt's early dislike for Churchill as a hawkish imperialist. Churchill works relentlessly to persuade Roosevelt to bring the United States into the war, although this does not fully happen until the Japanese attack on Pearl Harbor on 7 December 1941. King George VI, initially dismayed at having to deal with Churchill instead of Halifax, also is won over by Churchill's courage and personal charm over the years. When a naval aide finally brings Churchill the news that Germany has surrendered unconditionally as of midnight on 8 May 1945, Churchill is invited to join the King and his family on the balcony at Buckingham Palace before a jubilant crowd of thousands that has gathered in the street outside.

An end to the war does not mean all is well, however. Labour leader Clement Attlee soon comes to Churchill and resigns from the cabinet, dissolving the coalition government. Churchill fights against both the Labour Party, whom he privately despises, and any discussion of regarding the war as truly over while Japan remains undefeated. The British people have had enough of war, however, and the Labour Party gains traction as Churchill continues to insist on staying on a war footing until the Pacific campaign is finished. Against his wife's strong objections, Churchill goes on the air and in a live radio speech condemns the Labour Party as being no different from communists and says that they would have to "resort to some form of Gestapo" to maintain control if they were voted into office. The result is predictable: both leftist Britons and Britons weary of a long and bloody war vote Churchill out of office, replacing him with Clement Attlee. Churchill broods over his fate, over the changing of the times and the gradual dissipation of the old way of life he holds dear, and admits that he feels lonely without a war to bring him purpose. When asked if he would want to relive the war again, Churchill tells an aide, "1940. Just 1940."

The war's end also brings about a renewed push for independence by British colonial possessions, and their inevitable success means the permanent dissolution of one of Churchill's most beloved institutions, the British Empire. Out of office, feeling lost and betrayed by the very people he fought so hard to defend, Churchill is resentful and bitter while Clementine brings them both to attend a play in London one night. The Churchills' presence in the theater does not go unnoticed, however; at the conclusion of the play, one of the actors announces Churchill, hailing him as "the savior of our nation." The entire theater stands to applaud and cheer as Churchill rises with Clementine, giving the "V for Victory" salute. The film closes with Churchill's personal motto for leadership in government: "In War: Resolution. In Defeat: Defiance. In Victory: Magnanimity. In Peace: Good Will."

Cast
 Brendan Gleeson as Winston Churchill
 Adrian Scarborough as Sawyers
 Clive Mantle as Walter H. Thompson
 Jack Shepherd as Neville Chamberlain
 Donald Sumpter as Edward Wood, 1st Earl of Halifax
 Iain Glen as King George VI
 James D'Arcy as Jock Colville
 Bill Paterson as Clement Attlee
 Bruce Alexander as Duff Cooper
 Janet McTeer as Clementine Churchill
 Michael Elwyn as Charles Wilson, 1st Baron Moran
 Robert Pugh as Hastings Ismay, 1st Baron Ismay
 Terrence Hardiman as Richard Pim
 Garrick Hagon as Harry Hopkins
 Len Cariou as Franklin D. Roosevelt
 Patrick Malahide as Bernard Montgomery
 Geoffrey Kirkness as Alan Brooke, 1st Viscount Alanbrooke
 Philip McGough as Aneurin Bevan
 Michael Pennington as Sir Arthur Harris, 1st Baronet
 Aleksey Petrenko as Joseph Stalin

Awards and nominations

See also
 The Gathering Storm – 1974 similar film starring Richard Burton
 The Gathering Storm - 2002 film starring Albert Finney
 Churchill – 2017 film starring Brian Cox as Churchill
 Darkest Hour – 2017 film starring Gary Oldman
 Dunkirk – 2017 film focusing on Operation Dynamo

References

External links

 
 Into The Storm - HBO
 Into The Storm - HBO Canada
 Interview with Brendan Gleeson by Tavis Smiley about Into the Storm

2009 films
2009 television films
American biographical films
American historical drama films
Biographical films about politicians
Cultural depictions of George VI
Cultural depictions of Joseph Stalin
Cultural depictions of Bernard Montgomery
Cultural depictions of Franklin D. Roosevelt
Cultural depictions of Neville Chamberlain
Cultural depictions of Winston Churchill
British biographical films
British World War II films
British historical drama films
Films about politicians
Films about Winston Churchill
Films directed by Thaddeus O'Sullivan
Films set in the 1940s
HBO Films films
World War II films based on actual events
American drama television films
2000s American films
2000s British films